Tamzin Thomas (born 6 October 1997) is a South African sprinter. She won two medals at the 2015 African Junior Championships.

International competitions

1Did not start in the semifinals

Personal bests

Outdoor
100 metres – 11.41 (+1.6 m/s, Pretoria 2018)
200 metres – 23.12 (+1.7 m/s, Pretoria 2018)

References

1997 births
Living people
South African female sprinters
Athletes (track and field) at the 2019 African Games
Competitors at the 2017 Summer Universiade
Competitors at the 2019 Summer Universiade
African Games competitors for South Africa
African Games medalists in athletics (track and field)
African Games silver medalists for South Africa
20th-century South African women
21st-century South African women